Chinese Midnight Express is a 1997 Hong Kong crime drama film directed by Billy Tang. Set in the 1960s, the film stars Tony Leung Chiu-wai as a righteous journalists who gets framed into prison after exposing the collusion between the corrupt police force and triads.

Cast
Tony Leung Chiu-wai as Ching On
Pinky Cheung as Jess
Ng Man-tat as Brother Plane
Ben Lam as Miu Yan-sing
Ben Ng as Inspector Cheung Yiu-cho
Elvis Tsui as Three Legs
Lee Siu-kei as Brother Nam
Frankie Ng as Brother Doggie
John Ching as Brother Bill
Raven Choi as Brother Wai
Bowie Lau
Sung Boon-chung as Lok
Wan Yeung-ming as Inspector Wan Chi-ho
Law Kar-ying as warden
Lee Lik-chi as MP
Peter Lai as Uncle Kin
 as On's boss
Lai Suen as On's mom

External links
 

1997 films
1997 crime drama films
1990s prison drama films
Hong Kong crime drama films
Hong Kong prison films
Triad films
1990s Cantonese-language films
Films directed by Billy Tang
Films about journalists
Films about miscarriage of justice
Films set in the 1960s
Films set in Hong Kong
Films shot in Hong Kong
1990s Hong Kong films